TG3 (TeleGiornale 3) is the brand for Italian state-owned TV channel Rai 3's news programmes. They are shown domestically and across Europe on Rai 3. The newscasts are aired from Rai's Studios in Saxa Rubra, Rome, Italy, except for the 12 pm edition which is broadcast from Milan
The head-journalist of the show is Giuseppina Paterniti from 31 October 2018. It was launched in 1979, and was named T3 (Telegiornale 3) from 1999 to 2000.

Directors of the TG3

Note: the names highlighted in blue concern the directors who, in addition to directing the TG3, also directed the TGR.
 Antonio Di Bella is director of TGR only from 2001 to 2002.

Programme format
The programme is generally presented by a single newsreader Most items will be made up of reports and are generally preceded and followed by the correspondent reporting live from the scene of the report.

Daily programme
They are also other features with TG3 brand, all on Rai 3:
GT Ragazzi (devoted to a youth audiences, aired on Rai Gulp).

Criticism and controversies
The Undersecretary to Communications Paolo Romani, member of The People of Freedom, in an interview with the newspaper Il Tempo, has defined that the TG3 "is politically affiliate with the Leftists".

Presenters

TG3 Linea Notte
This is aired from Monday to Friday at 00:00 (58 minutes), summer editions are known as TG3 Linea Notte Estate which airs between 23:00 and 23:30. Presenters:
Maurizio Mannoni

TG3 Flash
This is aired on Sunday, between 23:00 and 00:00 (7–10 minutes).
Tindara Caccetta
Niccolò Bellagamba
Paolo Piras
Sara Segatori
Giusi Sansone

TG3 Mondo
This is aired on Saturdays and Sundays between 23:00 and 00:00. Presenters:
Maria Cuffaro

TG3 ore 12:00
This edition comes from Milan
Paolo Pasi
Paola Maria Anelli
Annamaria Levorin
Jari Pilati

TG3 Fuori TG
This is aired from Monday to Friday at 13:40 (19–20 minutes). Presenters:
Maria Rosaria De Medici

TG3 ore 14:20
This is aired from Monday to Saturday at 14:20, Sundays at 14:15 (15–25 minutes). Presenters: 
 Cristiana Palazzoni
 Andrea Rustichelli
 Chiara Garzilli
 Elisabetta Margonari

TG3 LIS
This edition is signed for the deaf. It's aired from Monday to Saturday at 14:55, Sundays at 12:55 (2–3 minutes). Presenters are the same of 14:20 edition.

TG3 ore 19:00 
This airs every day at 19:00 (30–32 minutes). Presenters: 
 Mario Franco Cao
 Alessandra Carli
 Valentina Antonello
 Tatiana Lisanti

Speciale TG3
This airs only a few times a year or even none (2–108 minutes). This focus on the major stories that the world is talking about.

TG3Web

The Tg3 offers both internet and TV content on the web. The Internet Editorial Board is made up of Giancarlo Agostinelli, Riccardo Corbò, Pasquale Martello and Alfredo Trenca. He deals with the multimedia contents of the header. It cares for the site that offers the ability to see the Tg3 live while working on the PC; Makes it possible to review the newscast immediately after the broadcast; Allows you to review every single service. Allows you to browse the Tg3 archive and headings. It puts online images, interviews and exclusive services that you can only see on the headline website. It makes it possible to interact with the editorial team and create a community of active information users of the Tg3 that goes beyond the airtime and constitutes an always open channel.

The exclusive rubrics for the web:

 Tg3 Tech
 Tg3 Tech Books
 Tg3 Comics
 Tg3 Ludus
 Tg3 La Vignetta
 Tg3 Videochat

The Facebook page of the Tg3 is constantly updated by the editorial staff, with news videos, polls, exclusive articles and interactions with public comments

Direction

 Director: 
 Simona Sala
 Vicedirector:
 Maurizio Ambrogi
 Carmen Santoro
 Giorgio Saba
 Pierluca Terzulli
Antonella Zunica

See also
Rai 3

References

External links
http://www.tg3.rai.it/ 

Rai (broadcaster)
Mass media in Rome
Italian television news shows
1979 Italian television series debuts
1970s Italian television series
1980s Italian television series
1990s Italian television series
2000s Italian television series
2010s Italian television series